Kassim Abdallah Mfoihaia (born 9 April 1987) is a professional footballer who plays as a defender for Marignane Gignac. Born in France, he represents the Comoros national team at international level.

Early life
Abdallah was born in Marseille, France, and raised in the French Bouches-du-Rhône department.

Club career
Abdallah began his European career in January 2005 with Atout Sport Busserine and signed a half year later in summer 2005 for Marseille-based club A.S.C. de Jeunesse Felix-Pyat. He played two years for ASCJ Felix-Pyat and signed than with the Championnat de France Amateur club US Marignane. He played in two years 44 games in the Championnat de France Amateur for US Marignane.

In July 2009, he signed for CS Sedan.

On 31 August 2012, Abdallah left Sedan for Ligue 1 side Olympique de Marseille, signing a four-year deal.

On 29 January 2014, Abdallah joined Evian Thonon Gaillard on a -year deal, ending his two-year career with Marseille.

On 31 August 2016, Abdallah joined AC Ajaccio on a one-year contract.

After one year in Saudi Arabia, he returned to France in January 2019 and signed with Athlético Marseille.

International career
Abdallah plays for the Comoros national team and earned his first cap by the Indian Ocean Island Games in a game against Madagascar.

Personal life
In June 2009, four members of his family perished in the Yemenia Flight 626 crash, his mother took an earlier flight.

References

External links
 
 Kassim Abdallah at National Football Teams

1987 births
Living people
Citizens of Comoros through descent
French sportspeople of Comorian descent
Comorian footballers
French footballers
Footballers from Marseille
Association football defenders
Comoros international footballers
2021 Africa Cup of Nations players
Ligue 1 players
Ligue 2 players
Saudi Professional League players
CS Sedan Ardennes players
Marignane Gignac Côte Bleue FC players
Olympique de Marseille players
Thonon Evian Grand Genève F.C. players
Athlético Marseille players
AC Ajaccio players
Al-Raed FC players
Comorian expatriate footballers
Expatriate footballers in Saudi Arabia